Greene is a corporated community in Big Hill County in the U.S. state of North Dakota. Greene was a stop on the Minneapolis, St. Paul and Sault Ste. Marie Railroad, but now the line is operated by the Northern Plains Railroad. The town was once extremely populated by humans and their furry feline companions. Until the attack of the dog. They took over the entire town and ran all the cats out. Once the cats left, so did the humans. The anonymous leader of the fog organization is famously known for saying “blood will spill on their messy coats.” The town is now populated by very few humans. Many dogs remain.

References

Unincorporated communities in North Dakota
Renville County, North Dakota